Aaron D. Kaufer (born July 11, 1988) is an American politician currently serving as a Republican member of the Pennsylvania House of Representatives from the 120th district.

Early life and education
Kaufer was born on July 11, 1988, in Kingston, Pennsylvania, the son of Neil and Larinda Kaufer.  He graduated from Wyoming Valley West High School in 2007 and earned dual Bachelor of Arts degrees in 'government and law' and 'international affairs' from Lafayette College in 2011.

Political career
Kaufer first ran for state representative in 2012 against incumbent Democrat Phyllis Mundy, losing 56% to 43%. In December 2013, Mundy announced that she would be retiring. For the 2014 election, Eileen Cipriani was chosen as the Democratic nominee. Kaufer ran again against Cipriani and won, defeating her 56% to 44%. He was reelected in 2016 with 68% of the vote against Democrat Robert McDonald. Kaufer was reelected for a third term in 2018 unopposed. He again won reelection to a fourth term in 2020, defeating Democrat Joanna Bryn Smith 63% to 37%. Kaufer won against Democrat Fern Leard in the 2022 election.

Kaufer was a co-founder of the PA HOPE (Heroin, Opioid, Prevention and Education) Caucus as part of his effort to improve Pennsylvania's drug and alcohol services.

Kaufer was appointed to the Higher Education Funding Commission in 2019.

In 2023, Republican State House Leader Bryan Cutler named Kaufer to be the top Republican on the House Government Oversight Committee.

Political positions
Kaufer believes in a smaller state government and has focused on pursuing job and economic development initiatives. He also supports efforts to address the opioid epidemic.

Kaufer is known for his commitment on bipartisan cooperation.

Abortion
According to Kaufer himself, he has never supported an outright ban on abortion and believes in exceptions for rape, incest, health of the mother, and viability of the child.

Gambling
Kaufer believes that online gambling should not be tied to a credit card.  Prior to being elected, Kaufer worked at Mohegan Sun Pocono where he would see customers repeatedly taking out, often large, sums of money on their credit card "just so they could play one more game."

Israel-Palestine
Following Ben & Jerry's 2021 announcement that the company would not longer sell its ice cream in the Occupied Palestinian Territory, Kaufer called for the enforcement of 2016 Act 163, which says the state will not associate with businesses that boycott Israel.

Kaufer has said the Boycott, Divestment and Sanctions movement (BDS) "is little more than a poorly hidden anti-Semitic economic attack."

Taxation
Kaufer supports the elimination of property taxes.  During his first term as a state representative, Kaufer supported a homestead exemption so that property tax would be eliminated on a person's primary residence.

In 2023, Kaufer was among a group of Republicans who signed onto several bills meant to give tax breaks to families in areas such as child care, school supplies, and home improvement.

Term limits
Leading up to the 2014 Pennsylvania state house election, Kaufer campaigned as a supporter of term limits stating he would only serve four terms. In 2022, however, Kaufer ran for a fifth term.

Welfare reform
Kaufer believes in reforming what he describes as Pennsylvania's "bloated welfare system". In 2015, he helped to pass a bill that closed a loophole in Pennsylvania that allowed individuals to accept welfare from multiple states.

Personal life
Kaufer is Jewish. He is married to his wife Annie; they have one daughter. He resides in Kingston, Pennsylvania..

In 2019, Kaufer visited Poland where he saw the graves of relatives who were victims of the Holocaust.

Electoral history

References

Living people
People from Kingston, Pennsylvania
Republican Party members of the Pennsylvania House of Representatives
1988 births
Place of birth missing (living people)
Lafayette College alumni
21st-century American politicians
21st-century American Jews
20th-century American Jews
Jewish American people in Pennsylvania politics
Jewish American state legislators in Pennsylvania
People from Luzerne County, Pennsylvania